"Dem Vaterland" is a patriotic anthem written by Robert Reinick and set to music by Hugo Wolf.

History
Wolf, who unsuccessfully attempted to dedicate Dem Vaterland to Emperor William II, originally wrote it as a song for tenor and piano in 1890, but later arranged it for male voices and orchestra. His personal love for the song is attested by the following letter he wrote to Melanie Köchert:

Text

References

External links
 Dem Vaterland (version for orchestra) on YouTube
 Dem Vaterland (version for piano) on Amazon

German patriotic songs
German music
German culture
German poems